Return on investment (ROI) or return on costs (ROC) is a ratio between net income (over a period) and investment (costs resulting from an investment of some resources at a point in time). A high ROI means the investment's gains compare favourably to its cost. As a performance measure, ROI is used to evaluate the efficiency of an investment or to compare the efficiencies of several different investments. In economic terms, it is one way of relating profits to capital invested.

Purpose 

In business, the purpose of the return on investment (ROI) metric is to measure, per period, rates of return on money invested in an economic entity in order to decide whether or not to undertake an investment. It is also used as an indicator to compare different investments within a portfolio. The investment with the largest ROI is usually prioritized, even though the spread of ROI over the time period of an investment should also be taken into account. Recently, the concept has also been applied to scientific funding agencies’ (e.g., National Science Foundation) investments in research of open source hardware and subsequent returns for direct digital replication.

ROI and related metrics provide a snapshot of profitability, adjusted for the size of the investment assets tied up in the enterprise. ROI is often compared to expected (or required) rates of return on money invested. ROI is not time-adjusted (unlike e.g. net present value): most textbooks describe it with a "Year 0" investment and two to three years' income.

Marketing decisions have an obvious potential connection to the numerator of ROI (profits), but these same decisions often influence assets’ usage and capital requirements (for example, receivables and inventories). Marketers should understand the position of their company and the returns expected. For a marketing ROI percentage to be credible, the effects of the marketing program must be isolated from other influences when reported to executives. In a survey of nearly 200 senior marketing managers, 77 percent responded that they found the "return on investment" metric very useful.

Return on investment may be extended to terms other than financial gain. For example, social return on investment (SROI) is a principles-based method for measuring extra-financial value (i.e., environmental and social value not currently reflected in conventional financial accounts) relative to resources invested. It can be used by any entity to evaluate the impact on stakeholders, identify ways to improve performance and enhance the performance of investments.

Limitations with ROI usage
As a decision tool, it is simple to understand. The simplicity of the formula allows users to freely choose variables, e.g., length of the calculation time, whether overhead cost is included, or which factors are used to calculate income or cost components. The use of ROI as an indicator for prioritizing investment projects alone can be misleading since usually the ROI figure is not accompanied by an explanation of its make-up. ROI should be accompanied by the underlying data that forms the inputs, this is often in the format of a business case. For long-term investments, the need for a Net Present Value adjustment is great and without it the ROI is incorrect. Similar to discounted cash flow, a Discounted ROI should be used instead. One limitation associated with the traditional ROI calculation is that it does not fully "capture the short-term or long-term importance, value, or risks associated with natural and social capital" because it does not account for the environmental, social, and governance performance of an organization. Without a metric for measuring the short- and long-term environmental, social and governance performance of a firm, decision makers are planning for the future without considering the extent of the impacts associated with their decisions. One or more separate measures, aligned with relevant compliance functions, are frequently provided for this purpose.

Calculation 
Return on investment can be calculated in different ways depending on the goal and application. The most comprehensive formula is:

Return on investment (%) = (current value of investment if not exited yet or sold price of investment if exited + income from investment − initial investment and other expenses) / initial investment and other expenses x 100%.

Example with a share of stock:
You bought 1 share of stock for US$100 and paid a buying commission of US$5. Then over a year you received US$4 of dividends and sold the share 1 year after you bought it for US$200 paying a US$5 selling commission.

Your ROI is the following:

ROI = (200 + 4 - 100 - 5 - 5) / (100 + 5 + 5) x 100% = 85.45%

As the duration of this investment is 1 year, this ROI is annual.

For a single-period review, divide the return (net profit) by the resources that were committed (investment):

return on investment = Net income / Investment
where:
Net income = gross profit − expenses.
investment = stock +  + claims.

or

return on investment = (gain from investment − cost of investment) / cost of investment

or

return on investment = (revenue − cost of goods sold) / cost of goods sold

or

return on investment = (net program benefits / program costs) x 100

Property
Complications in calculating ROI can arise when real property is refinanced, or a second mortgage is taken out. Interest on a second, or refinanced, loan may increase, and loan fees may be charged, both of which can reduce the ROI, when the new numbers are used in the ROI equation. There may also be an increase in maintenance costs and property taxes, and an increase in utility rates if the owner of a residential rental or commercial property pays these expenses.

Complex calculations may also be required for property bought with an adjustable rate mortgage (ARM) with a variable escalating rate charged annually through the duration of the loan.

Marketing investment
Marketing not only influences net profits but also can affect investment levels too. New plants and equipment, inventories, and accounts receivable are three of the main categories of investments that can be affected by marketing decisions. 

RoA, RoNA, RoC, and RoIC, in particular, are similar measures with variations on how 'investment' is defined.

ROI is a popular metric for heads of marketing because of marketing budget allocation. Return on Investment helps identify marketing mix activities that should continue to be funded and which should be cut.

Return on integration (ROInt) 
To address the lack of integration of the short and long term importance, value and risks associated with natural and social capital into the traditional ROI calculation, companies are valuing their environmental, social and governance (ESG) performance through an integrated management approach to reporting that expands ROI to Return on Integration. This allows companies to value their investments not just for their financial return but also the long term environmental and social return of their investments. By highlighting environmental, social and governance performance in reporting, decision makers have the opportunity to identify new areas for value creation that are not revealed through traditional financial reporting.  The social cost of carbon is one value that can be incorporated into Return on Integration calculations to encompass the damage to society from greenhouse gas emissions that result from an investment. This is an integrated approach to reporting that supports Integrated Bottom Line (IBL) decision making, which takes triple bottom line (TBL) a step further and combines financial, environmental and social performance reporting into one balance sheet. This approach provides decision makers with the insight to identify opportunities for value creation that promote growth and change within an organization.

See also 
Bang for the buck
Energy return on energy invested
Internal rate of return
Marketing plan
Price–earnings ratio
Rate of profit
Rate of return (RoR), also known as 'rate of profit' or sometimes just 'return', is the ratio of money gained or lost (whether realized or unrealized) on an investment relative to the amount of money invested
Return on assets (RoA)
Return on brand (ROB) 
Return on capital employed (ROCE) 
Return on capital (RoC)
Return on equity (ROE) 
Return on invested capital (RoIC)
Return on marketing investment (ROMI) is "the contribution attributable to marketing (net of marketing spending), divided by the marketing 'invested' or risked
Return on modeling effort (ROME)
Return on net assets (RoNA)
ROI for information technology is used to evaluate applications portfolios and information systems
Time to value

References 

Investment
Factor income distribution
Yield (finance)